Francis Willey Kelsey (May 23, 1858 – May 14, 1927) was a classics scholar, professor, and archaeologist that would go on to lead the first expedition to the Near-East done by the University of Michigan (U of M). His papyrus findings and the collection of antiquities he acquired for the university brought him fame not only among University of Michigan faculty but around the world. Originally hailing from New York, he would teach at Lake Forest University, in Illinois, eventually coming to the University of Michigan. He was the secretary of the Archaeological Institute of America, Vice President, and eventually President, of the American Philological Association while he was at U of M.

Early life
Francis Kelsey's life started in Ogden, New York, a city located in Monroe County, New York on May 23, 1858. Kelsey was the fourth child of Henry Kelsey and Olive Trowbridge Kelsey and was named after his grandmother on his mother's side. Francis' father, Henry, originally wanted to go into the medical field. This goal would consume at least ten years of his life, to pay for his medical training he not only was a school teacher but would travel at night to teach singing lessons. Quite unfortunately, he would learn at age 28, when he had enough funds to join a doctor's office as a student, that, ironically, his lack of knowledge of Greek and Latin would make his studies even longer.   Greek and Latin were still very important in the medical field at this time, Henry was discouraged and to his medical career and instead bought a farm near his parents home in Stony Point. He married Olive Cornelia Trowbridge in 1842, sister to antislavery writer and friend of Mark Twain, John Townsend Trowbridge.
The Kelseys would stay at the farm in Stony Point until Francis was two years old and then moved to larger farm at Churchville.  There was a school in town that Francis attended but to go to secondary school he would have to travel to the Lockport Union School, about sixty miles away. He enrolled when he was 15 and sources think because the school was so far from home he was most likely a boarder. After attending Lockport, he went to the University of Rochester where he followed the Classical Course  and won numerous awards including a sophomore prize in Latin and a junior prize in Greek. While there is no doubt that Kelsey was very studious, that did not mean his time at university was constantly spent in the library. From time to time he enjoyed a practical joke, he ended up creating a chemistry lab in his boarding house at one point, making stink bombs to ward off the occasional, unwelcome guest. He graduated in 1880 being elected valedictorian.

Career

Lake Forest University
After graduation he was appointed instructor of classics at Lake Forest University in Lake Forest Illinois, a new college in the northern suburbs of Chicago that was meant to be a  competitor of  Northwestern University in Evanston. Kelsey's time at Lake Forest allowed him  to discover his desires for improvement within his craft of educating the classics and to develop his professionalism. Within his first couple of years he would write articles for a college journal called the Lake Forest University Review, on his views of the classics and would eventually become editor. Unfortunately the main funding behind the Lake Forest University Review was from the prior editor so it went defunct within a year of Kelsey being appointed to his position.
Kelsey was constantly trying to improve himself in terms of his knowledge and how he could become a better teacher. While he was at Lake Forest University he would visit Europe to learn more about archaeology. His first visits were to Italy specifically Pompeii but he would also visit some German Universities. He attended Leipzig University in 1884 to expand his knowledge on classical archaeology, but these studies never accumulated into a degree. At the time many American scholars were turning to Europe for higher education for themselves, though Kelsey soon became very disillusioned with the way it was taught at Leipzig. In 1885 he was back in Southern Europe visiting Italy, Greece, and Asia Minor, discovering different ways to teach the classics.
At Lake Forest Kelsey also started his textbook writing career. While there are a lot of textbooks already about Latin grammar and syntax, his books tried to give context to the actual things he was writing about so people would not just learn the language but the culture. The amount of detail he put into them was unprecedented and showed within the learning community since one of his textbooks, Caesar's Gallic War, went through twenty one different edition in his lifetime and can still be purchased today.
A conflict at Lake Forest over the appropriate roles of research and teaching there would lead to the departure of Kelsey and other faculty members. Post Civil War United States, saw an increase in interest in the German model of higher education that included research and the creation of graduate programs. A political connection led powerful people at Lake Forest University to sway against the German Model. The Haymarket Riot in Chicago, the closest major city to Lake Forest University, started over workers feeling they were not treated fairly enough by employers. Many of the workers were of German descent which caused a huge rift with the English and Scottish Presbyterian elite. 
This caused issues for Lake Forest where the faculty wanted the school to turn towards the German model while the trustees with the funds were turned off from things associated with anything German, including the university model. Kelsey did not sway one way or another, he agreed with aspects of both, he recognized the importance of science courses but his heart was with the classics and he supported ideas that kept them as a top priority. His ideas did heavily align with the president of his alma mater, University of Rochester, and for his writings on the topic of higher education he received a PhD in philology. Eventually him and other professors would leave Lake Forest to other institutions that showed interest in creating a more comprehensive graduate education. He spent a total of eight years at Lake Forest and proved to be a time of great growth.

University of Michigan
Kelsey started at the University of Michigan (U of M) in fall of 1889 as professor of Latin. From his first semester he made sure the books his students needed were available to check out at the library. This practice was new for the time and would not become precedent until 1915, at U of M, clearly Kelsey did not care much for rules. Similarly to Lake Forest, Kelsey made sure his classes were not just on the languages he was teaching but the culture and the context of the times, he even went as far as to set up a classical fellowship to study archaeology. 
Things soon began to change. When Tappan became president, in 1852,  he no longer made classical language a requirement, made the idea of graduate education at U of M a reality, and created a Bachelor of Science. This eventually led to a drop of 40% of undergraduate students, but an increase in grad students studying classics in Kelsey's time. Overall, Kelsey did not mind. Between 1900 and 1901, Kelsey took a year off to teach at the American School of Classical Studies in Rome, lecturing on all things Rome and helping students with their individual research. When Kelsey came back to U of M the
Classical Department saw renewed interest especially from the Regents. At this point in university history classes were usually taught in instructors houses and Kelsey was no different. In addition to hosting classes, he would also host Classical Club and would often invite important persons from out of town. Kelsey, at one event, said there were over 50 people at his house, participating in what he called a "conversazione."
Once Kelsey returned, he saw increased popularity, his time abroad contributing to him becoming the lead American scholar on Pompeii, a current interest of United States citizens. In 1902 he was selected to be the secretary of the Archaeological Institute of America (AIA), adding to his prestige and led him into a bit of politics.  Throughout his tenure as secretary, one of his most frustrating endeavors was trying to pass legislation within congress about how artifacts from other countries should be handled by the United States. After a stalemate within congress, the AIA teamed up with the American Anthropological Association to eventually, and thankfully for Kelsey's sanity, pass a resolution in 1905, the same year he was named Vice President of the American Philological Association. By the end of 1906 he was elected president of the American Philological Association, a title he would hang onto until the end of 1907.

University Musical Society presidency
Kelsey's time at U of M was not only marked by his  academic career but also by being president of the University Musical Society (UMS). While no records show that Kelsey played any instruments, his daughters played the violin, a skill he said he enjoyed and made sure they practiced regularly. In his role as UMS president Kelsey was a major factor behind the construction of Hill Auditorium one of the concert halls designed by Albert Kahn and opened in 1913 that is still in use on the campus today. Plans for an auditorium for UMS has been in the words since 1890s but until the funds from the estate of alumnus Arthur Hill were disclosed, there was no guarantee it would ever happen.  Kelsey  sought out famous Detroit architect Albert Kahn and discussed the possibility of Hill Auditorium with him. Kelsey gave Kahn two options of where to construct the building, he eventually picked the location on North State street that thousands of students now walk past and perform in regularly. At first Kelsey was adamant about the auditorium stage being able to host performances as professional as operas but the regents, especially Clements, opposed this.
In 1913 Hill Auditorium had its induction ceremony and shortly afterwards the Frieze organ, for which Kelsey had raised the funds, was moved into its new home. While the organ for UMS and Hill Auditorium were mostly one time fundraising projects, Kelsey was constantly fundraising to ensure his research, associations he was a part of, and the overall Classics Department.  In 1904 Kelsey started his own research oriented journal called the University of Michigan's Humanistic Series that he was editor of from 1904 to 1927, and this required that Kelsey fundraise including among well to do businessmen in Detroit. . To say that he was good at networking would be an understatement.

Expeditions to the Near-East
Starting in 1919 Kelsey was talking to a successful Detroit manufacturer by the name of Standish Backish who showed interest in putting together an expedition to the Near East. Backish was talking to a professor, by the name of Caspar Rene Gregory, who, after he died in World War I, inspired him organize an expedition for the retrieval of biblical documents. Standish considered himself too old, so he asked Kelsey to lead it. Kelsey agreed and fundraising started, being quite a lot easier than last time.  For some reason investors found archaeology a bit more intriguing than organs. Backish would prove to be helpful through the entire process, assisting with financial issues and navigating in Europe when the World War I had just ended. This first expedition would start by ship from the East Coast to Glasgow, making  its way to London, then Paris and eventually towards Constantinople, Near East, and Asia Minor. The entire expedition was expected to take two years, one for exploration and the other for writing and research which would be done between London and Paris since at the time, that is where the only copies of other ancient manuscripts were located. While originally Backish suggested that the main objective be for the retrieval of biblical texts, it was also brought up that documentation of the battlefields that Julius Caesar fought on should also be researched and heavily photographed. Overall the expedition was a huge success, Kelsey returned with Isabelle and Easton to Ann Arbor in 1921 to resume teaching and to even more renown than before. He would go  on a second expedition in 1927 that would yield even more antiquities and papyrus, specifically from Egypt. Unfortunately just after returning from his last expedition he started feeling chest pains.

Personal life
While at Lake Forest Kelsey began some endeavors that were not purely
academic. Kelsey would meet a student who went by the name of Belle Badger who showed an interest in the classics and antiquities. She also wrote at least two articles for The Lake Forest Review so it is no surprise that at some point her path would cross with Kelsey's. After Belle got her degree (going by Isabelle for the remainder of her life), she and Kelsey would be married in 1885 and eventually would have three kids, Charlotte, Ruth, and Easton. Kelsey was also a proud practicing Presbyterian, part of the reason he was so drawn to Forest Lake University in the first place. He made his religious views well known by some of his articles within the Lake Forest Review.

Death
Immediately after returning to Ann Arbor he went to the hospital, the next weeks half of his time being spent at home and the other at the hospital but that did not stop his work. Throughout this period of illness, his commitment to archaeology and the university did not fall through the cracks, he was still looking over manuscripts and doing administrative work.  On May 14 he passed into a coma and died shortly afterward, the cause of death being rheumatism in his chest.

Legacy
The artifacts returned from these expeditions would form the core of the university's holdings in classical archaeology and papyrology and papyrological studies was established under Kelsey's professorship.  For this reason, the university's museum of archaeology was named after Kelsey in 1953.

References

External links
 

1858 births
1927 deaths
University of Michigan faculty
Presidents of the Archaeological Institute of America